Hypnagogic pop (often abbreviated as h-pop) is pop or psychedelic music that evokes cultural memory and nostalgia for the popular entertainment of the past  (principally the 1980s). It emerged in the mid to late 2000s as American lo-fi and noise musicians began adopting retro aesthetics remembered from their childhood, such as radio rock, new wave pop, light rock, video game music, synth-pop, and R&B. Recordings circulated on cassette or Internet blogs and were typically marked by the use of outmoded analog equipment and DIY experimentation.

The genre's name was coined by journalist David Keenan in an August 2009 issue of The Wire to label the developing trend, which he characterized as "pop music refracted through the memory of a memory."  It was used interchangeably with "chillwave" or "glo-fi" and gained critical attention through artists such as Ariel Pink and James Ferraro. The music has been variously described as a 21st-century update of psychedelia, a reappropriation of media-saturated capitalist culture, and an "American cousin" to British hauntology.

In response to Keenan's article, The Wire received a slew of hate mail that derided hypnagogic pop as the "worst genre created by a journalist". Some of the tagged artists rejected the label or denied that such a unified style exists. During the 2010s, critical attention for the genre waned, although the style's "revisionist nostalgia" sublimated into various youth-oriented cultural zeitgeists. Hypnagogic pop evolved into vaporwave, with which it is sometimes conflated.

Characteristics

Hypnagogic pop is pop or psychedelic music that draws heavily from the popular music and culture of the 1980s – also ranging from the 1970s to the early 1990s. The genre reflects a preoccupation with outmoded analog technology and bombastic representations of synthetic elements from these epochs of pop culture, with its creators informed by collective memory as well as their personal histories. Per the imprecise nature of memory, the genre does not faithfully recreate the sounds and styles popular in those periods. In this way, hypnagogic pop distinguishes itself from revivalist movements. As authors Maël Guesdon and Philippe Le Guern write, the genre can be described as "revisionist nostalgia, not in the sense that 'everything used to be better' but because it rewrites collective memory with a view to being more faithful to an idea or a memory of the original than to the original itself."

Examples of specific sounds evoked by hypnagogic pop artists range from "ecstatically blurry and irradiated lo-fi pop" to "seventies cosmic-synth-rock" and "tripped-out, tribal exotica". Writing for Vice in 2011, Morgan Poyau described the genre as "making awkward bedfellows out of experimental music enthusiasts and weird progressive pop theorists." He described a typical manifestation of the style as featuring long tracks "saturated with echo, delay, smothered guitars and amputated synths." Critic Adam Trainer writes that, rather than a particular sound, the music was defined by a collection of artists who shared the same approaches and cultural experiences. He observed that their music drew from "the collective unconscious of late 1980s and early 1990s popular culture" while being "indebted stylistically to various traditions of experimentalism such as noise, drone, repetition, and improvisation."

Common reference points include various forms of 1980s music, including radio rock, new wave pop, MTV one-hit wonders, New Age music, synth-driven Hollywood blockbuster soundtracks, lounge music, easy-listening, corporate muzak, lite rock "schmaltz", video game music, and 1980s synth-pop and R&B. Recordings are often deliberately degraded, produced with analog equipment, and exhibit recording idiosyncrasies such as tape hiss. It employs sounds that were considered "futuristic" during the 1980s which, due to their outmoded nature, appear psychedelic out of context. Also common was the use of outmoded audiovisual technology and DIY digital imagery, such as compact cassettes, VHS, CD-R discs, and early Internet aesthetics.

Origins

Background and hauntology

In the 2000s, a wave of retro-inspired home-recording artists begun dominating underground indie scenes. The emergence of Ariel Pink's Haunted Graffiti, in particular, prompted journalistic discussion of the philosophical concept of hauntology, most prominently among the writers Simon Reynolds and Mark Fisher.  Later, the term "hauntology" was described as a British synonym for hypnagogic pop, while hypnagogic pop was described as an "American cousin" to Britain's hauntological music scene,

Todd Ledford, owner of the music label Olde English Spelling Bee (OESB), attributed a correlation between the proliferation of hypnagogic pop and the rise of YouTube. Reynolds attributed the origins of hypnagogic pop to Southern California and its culture. Trainer disagreed with Reynolds' assertion and said the style "arguably" emerged from numerous simultaneous scenes inhabited by artists working in a diverse form of "post-noise neo-psychedelia". Pitchforks Marc Masters offered that it may have originated "less [as] a movement than a coincidence". The music was often issued in the form of limited-edition cassettes or vinyl records before reaching a wider audience through blogs and YouTube videos.

Formative artists

Ariel Pink gained recognition in the mid 2000s through a string of self-produced albums, pioneering a sound that Reynolds called "'70s radio-rock and '80s new wave as if heard through a defective transistor radio, glimmers of melody flickering in and out of the fog".  He identified Pink and the Skaters as the "godparents of hypnagogic", but singled out Pink as the central figure to what he calls the "Altered Zones Generation", an umbrella term he designed for lo-fi, retro-inspired indie artists who were commonly featured on Altered Zones, an associate site for Pitchfork. Tiny Mix Tapes Jordan Redmond wrote that Pink's early collaborator John Maus was also placed "at the nexus of a number of recent popular movements" including hypnagogic pop, and that Maus was as "much of a progenitor of this sound as Pink, even though Pink has tended to be the headline-grabber."

R. Stevie Moore and Martin Newell were earlier artists who anticipated Pink's sound. Matthew Ingram of The Wire recognized Moore's influence on Pink and hypnagogic pop: "through his disciple ... he has unwittingly provided the [genre's] template". Another precursor to the genre was Nick Nicely and his 1982 single "Hilly Fields (1892)". Red Bull Musics J.R. Moore wrote that Nicely's "uniquely haphazard DIY aesthetic" and contemporary take on 1960s psychedelic pop "basically invented the sound of the 2000s Hypnagogic Pop movement decades beforehand."

The Skaters were a noise duo consisting of James Ferraro and Spencer Clark, and like Pink, were based in California. In the mid-2000s, they released dozens of CD-Rs and cassettes of psychedelic drone music, after which Ferraro and Clark each pursued solo outings. From 2009 to 2010, Ferraro's music evolved to be increasingly rhythmic and melodic, as Trainer describes, "an oversaturated sonic palette of cheesy pop reminiscent of early video game soundtracks and 1980s Saturday morning cartoons."

Complex contributor Joe Price felt that the h-pop movement was "birthed" by Ferraro and "the vastly overlooked [Missouri artist] 18 Carat Affair". In Reynolds' description, "other rising figures" from the original California scene included Sun Araw, LA Vampires and Puro Instinct. He added: "Other key hypnagogues such as Matrix Metals and Rangers reside elsewhere but seem SoCal in spirit." In a 2009 interview, Daniel Lopatin (Oneohtrix Point Never) stated that Salvador Dalí and Danny Wolfers were the "godfathers of hpop". He identified other progenitors to be DJ Screw, "retro kids", Joe Wenderoth, Autre Ne Veut, Church In Moon and DJ Dog Dick.

Etymology and initial popularity

Journalist David Keenan, who was known as a reporter of noise, freak folk, and drone music scenes, coined "hypnagogic pop" in an August 2009 piece for The Wire. He referred to a developing trend of 2000s lo-fi and post-noise music in which artists began to engage with elements of cultural nostalgia, childhood memory, and outdated recording technology. Inspired by comments by James Ferraro and Spencer Clark, and while invoking a similar concept discussed by Russian esotericist P.D. Ouspensky, Keenan employed the term "hypnagogic" as referring to the psychological state "between waking and sleeping, liminal zones where mis-hearings and hallucinations feed into the formation of dreams."

Among the artists discussed in Keenan's article were Ariel Pink, Daniel Lopatin, the Skaters, Gary War, Zola Jesus, Ducktails, Emeralds, and Pocahaunted. According to Keenan, these artists began to draw on cultural sources subconsciously remembered from their 1980s and early 1990s adolescence while freeing them from their historical contexts and "hom[ing] in on the futuristic signifiers" of the period. He alternately summarized hypnagogic pop as "pop music refracted through the memory of a memory" and as "1980's-inspired psychedelia" that engages with capitalist detritus of the past in an attempt to "dream of the future." In a later article, Keenan identified Lopatin, Ferraro, Clark, and ex-Test Icicles member Sam Mehran as hypnagogic pop's "most adventurous proponents".

Once "hypnagogic pop" was coined, a variety of music blogs immediately wrote about the phenomenon. By 2010, albums by Ariel Pink and Neon Indian were regularly hailed by publications like Pitchfork and The Wire, with "hypnagogic pop", "chillwave", and "glo-fi" employed to describe the evolving sounds of such artists, a number of which had songs of considerable success within independent music circles. Pink was frequently called "godfather" of h-pop, chillwave or glo-fi as new acts that were associated with him (aesthetically, personally, geographically, or professionally) attracted notice from critics. Some of his contemporaries, such as Ferraro, Clark, and War, failed to match his mainstream success. When this point was raised to Clark in a 2013 interview, he replied that Pink was simply "an ambassador of California, like the Beach Boys."

In 2010, Pitchfork launched Altered Zones, effectively an online newsletter for hypnagogic acts. Beginning that July, Altered Zones aggregated its content from a collective of leading blogs specializing in the movement. By the end of the year, OESB, now known for its roster of hypnagogic acts such as Ferraro and Mehran, had grown to be one of the most prominent underground indie labels. In January 2011, Keenan wrote that OESB was "the imprint most associated with H-pop" and "in many ways ... the label of 2010", although he mused, "It has been interesting to see how its demographic has morphed from an early underground/Noise audience to being embraced by the fringes of indie and dance culture, helped by groups like Forest Swords, who muddy the line between H-pop and dubstep."

Chillwave and vaporwave

"Chillwave", a tag used to describe a similar trend was coined one month before Keenan's 2009 article and was adopted synonymously with "hypnagogic pop". While the two styles are similar in that they both evoke 1980s–90s imagery, chillwave has a more commercial sound with an emphasis on "cheesy" hooks and reverb effects. A contemporary review by Marc Hogan for Neon Indian's Psychic Chasms (2009) listed "dream-beat", "chillwave", "glo-fi", "hypnagogic pop", and "hipster-gogic pop" as interchangeable terms for "psychedelic music that's generally one or all of the following: synth-based, homemade-sounding, 80s-referencing, cassette-oriented, sun-baked, laid-back, warped, hazy, emotionally distant, slightly out of focus."

The experimental tendencies of hypnagogic pop artists like Pink and Ferraro were soon amplified by the Internet-centric genre dubbed "vaporwave". Although the name shares the "-wave" suffix, it is only loosely connected to chillwave. Sam Mehran was one of the earliest hypnagogic acts to anticipate vaporwave, with his project Matrix Metals and the 2009 album Flamingo Breeze, which was built on synthesizer loops. That same year, Lopatin uploaded a collection of plunderphonics loops to YouTube inconspicuously under the alias sunsetcorp. These clips were later assembled for the album Chuck Person's Eccojams Vol. 1 (2010). Stereogums Miles Bowe summarized vaporwave as a combination of "the chopped and screwed plunderphonics of Dan Lopatin ... with the nihilistic easy-listening of James Ferraro’s Muzak-hellscapes on [the 2011 album] Far Side Virtual".

Writers, fans, and artists struggled to differentiate between hypnagogic pop, chillwave, and vaporwave. The earliest known use of the term "vaporwave" is generally attributed to an October 2011 blog post that discussed the hypnagogic album Surfs Pure Hearts by Girlhood. Adam Harper surmised that the author cited the work as "vaporwave" instead of "hypnagogic pop" possibly because they were unfamiliar with the latter term. He also remarked of "a special place in hell" for those who attempt to separate the three genres: "it's a back room where Satan forever explains the differences between death metal, black metal and doom metal."

According to Harper, vaporwave and hypnagogic pop share an affinity for "trash music", both are "dreamy" and "chirpy", and both "manipulate their material to defamiliarise it and give it a sense of the uncanny, such as slowing it down and/or lowering the pitch, making it, as the term goes, ‘screwed’." Of differences, vaporwave does not typically engage in long tracks, lo-fi productions, or non-sampled material, and it draws more from the early 1990s than it does the 1970s and 1980s. Compared to hypnagogic pop, vaporwave bears a stronger musical connection to chillwave for its sampling of slowed-down synth funk.

Impact, criticism, and decline

David Keenan's original Wire article incited a slew of hate mail that derided the "hypnagogic pop" label as the "worst genre created by a journalist". As the movement's popularity grew, the analogue lo-fi aspirations of Pink and Ferraro were taken up by "groups with names like Tape Deck Mountain, Memory Tapes, Memory Cassette – and turned into cliché." Both chillwave and vaporwave had been conceived as tongue-in-cheek, hyperbolic responses to such trends.

Keenan became disenchanted with artists of the movement who streamlined their sound and "chillwave" came to serve as a pejorative for such acts.  In the 2010 Rewind issue of The Wire, Keenan said that h-pop had "migrated from a process designed to liberate desire from marketing formulas to a carrot in the mouth of a corpse that has proved irresistible to underground musicians looking for an easy route to mainstream acceptance." He invoked chillwave as "one of the more meaningless sobriquets applied to the new future pop visions" and "a much more appropriate description of the mindless, depoliticised embracing of mainstream values that H-pop has come to be associated with."

Some of the tagged artists, such as Neon Indian and Toro y Moi, rejected the h-pop tag or denied that such a unified style exists. The Guardians Dorian Lynskey called the hypnagogic tag "pretentious", while New York Times writer Jon Pareles criticized the style as "annoyingly noncommittal music". The latter described a showcase of such bands at the 2010 South by Southwest festival as "a hedged, hipster imitation of the pop they're not brash enough to make". Altered Zones contributor Emilie Friedlander prophesied in 2011 that Ariel Pink, John Maus, James Ferraro, Spencer Clark, and R. Stevie Moore would be remembered as musicians who "elevated the crackle and grain of low-fidelity recording ... and made the vocabulary of pop music and the preoccupations of the avant-garde seem a lot less incompatible than much of the previous century had implied." However, like Keenan, she later wrote of her disenchantment with the movement following the "deliberately cringeworthy" example of Ferraro's Far Side Virtual. Weeks after the album's release, Altered Zones shut down. OESB also went defunct the same year.

Usage of "hypnagogic pop" has since diminished,  although the genre's "imagined sonic past" has sublimated into various pop culture zeitgeists. Likewise, an affinity for the retro proved itself as a hallmark of 2010s youth culture. In a 2012 interview, Pink acknowledged that he was aware that he "was doing something that sounded like the trace of a memory you can't place" and argued that such evocations had become so ingrained into modern music that "people take it for granted". On websites such as Drowned in Sound, Dummy Mag, and Electronic Beats, hauntology and hypnagogic pop were ultimately supplanted by an interest in post-Internet artists.

Cultural interpretations
Simon Reynolds described hypnagogic pop as a "21st-century update of psychedelia" in which "lost innocence has been contaminated by pop culture" and hyper-reality. He notes a particular concern with the "scrambling of pop time", suggesting that "perhaps the secret idea buried inside hypnagogic pop is that the '80s never ended. That we're still living there, subject to that decade's endless end of History." Guesdon and Le Guern posit that "the hypnagogic movement can be seen as an aesthetic response to the growing feeling that time is speeding up: a feeling that often proves to be one of the fundamental components of advanced modernity."

Adam Trainer suggested that the style allowed artists to engage with the products of media-saturated capitalist consumer culture in a way that focuses on affect rather than irony or cynicism. Adam Harper noted among hypnagogic pop artists a tendency "to turn trash, something shallow and determinedly throwaway, into something sacred or mystical" and to "manipulate their material to defamiliarise it and give it a sense of the uncanny."

See also
 Microgenre

Notes

References

Works cited 
 
 

 
2000s in music
2009 introductions
21st-century music genres
Hauntology
Pop music genres
Psychedelic music
2009 neologisms
Retro style
Neo-psychedelia
Nostalgia
Indie music